There is also an asteroid called 548 Kressida.

Cressida  is an inner satellite of Uranus. It was discovered from the images taken by Voyager 2 on 9 January 1986, and was given the temporary designation S/1986 U 3. It was named after Cressida, the Trojan daughter of Calchas, a tragic heroine who appears in William Shakespeare's play Troilus and Cressida (as well as in tales by Geoffrey Chaucer and others). It is also designated Uranus IX.

Cressida belongs to the Portia group of satellites, which includes Bianca, Desdemona, Juliet, Portia, Rosalind, Cupid, Belinda and Perdita. These satellites have similar orbits and photometric properties. Other than its orbit, radius of 41 km and geometric albedo of 0.08, virtually nothing is known about it.

In the Voyager 2 images Cressida appears as an elongated object, its major axis pointing towards Uranus. The ratio of axes of Cressida's prolate spheroid is 0.8 ± 0.3. Its surface is grey in color.

Cressida orbits close to a 3:2 resonance with the η ring, one of the rings of Uranus. Perturbations of the ring's shape provide a way to measure the mass of Cressida, which was found to be 2.5±0.4 kg. Cressida is the only small satellite of Uranus for which the mass has been directly measured.

Cressida may collide with Desdemona within the next 100 million years.

See also 

 Moons of Uranus

References 

Explanatory notes

Citations

External links 
 Cressida Profile by NASA's Solar System Exploration
 Uranus' Known Satellites (by Scott S. Sheppard)

Moons of Uranus
19860109
Troilus and Cressida
Moons with a prograde orbit